Heide Trask Sr. High is a high school in eastern Rocky Point, North Carolina It is inside the Pender County School District. Its current principal is Gene Hudson.

Trask High has a population of around 700 students.

History 

Heide Trask High School is named after C. Heide Trask, a member of the North Carolina State Highway Commission.  The school's campus is built on land donated by the Trask family. Heide Trask High School opened in 2002 to prevent overcrowding at another local high school, Pender High School.

Sports 

Student athletic eligibility is determined by the successful passing of fifty percent of the classes in the semester prior to the semester of the sport participation. Serving as an on-campus intern, teacher assistant, and media assistant does not count as a class for eligibility. Students must be present in school no less than 85% of the semester in order to be eligible for the next semester’s sport season. Heide Trask Sr High School currently provides the following sports:

Cheerleading
Cross Country
Frisbee
Golf
J.V. Baseball
J.V. Football
J.V. Softball
J.V. Volleyball
Men's JV Basketball
Men's Soccer
Men's Varsity Basketball
Track
Varsity Baseball
Varsity Football
Varsity Softball
Varsity Volleyball
Women's Soccer
Women's Varsity Basketball
Wrestling

References

External links
Heide Trask Sr. High School website

Educational institutions in the United States with year of establishment missing
Public high schools in North Carolina
Schools in Pender County, North Carolina